Jing County or Jingxian is a county in Hengshui, Hebei province, People's Republic of China. Its seat is the town of Jingzhou.

Administrative divisions 

 Towns
Jingzhou, Longhua, Guangchuan, Jing County, Jiangheliu, Anling, Duqiao, Wangqiansi, Beiliuzhi, Liuzhimiao

 Townships
Liuji Township, Lianzhen Township, Liangji Township, Wencheng Township, Houliumingfu Township, Qinglan Township

Climate

Transportation
The county is served by Jingzhou railway station.

References

County-level divisions of Hebei